Abraham Annan Adjei (born 8 December 1988) is a Ghanaian international footballer. He currently plays as a midfielder for Heart of Lions.

Career
Born in Shema, Annan began his career with Heart of Lions, and had a trial in May 2008 with English side Leeds United.

International career
Annan made his international debut on 1 October 2009 against Argentina.

References

External links

1988 births
Living people
Ghanaian footballers
Ghana international footballers
Heart of Lions F.C. players
Association football midfielders